The Prek Tamak Bridge is situated 40 km north of Phnom Penh, Cambodia and provides a link between East and West by crossing the Mekong.

The contractor of the project was China's Shanghai Construction Group. Chinese ambassador Zhang Jinfeng stated that the construction of the bridge will promote economic development in Cambodia. The Prek Tamak Bridge is 1,060 meters in length and 13.5 meters in width and will accommodate speeds of 60 km per hour.

The construction period of the 43.5 million U.S. dollars project lasted about 50 months and it opened in 2010.

Road bridges in Cambodia
Buildings and structures in Kandal province
Bridges over the Mekong River
Bridges completed in 2010